Alluwali railway station is located in Pakistan. Punjab Near the High school For boys Union council office and Post Office Alluwali.

See also
 List of railway stations in Pakistan
 Pakistan Railways

References

Railway stations in Mianwali District
Railway stations on Kotri–Attock Railway Line (ML 2)